Tryptoline, also known as tetrahydro-β-carboline and tetrahydronorharmane, is a natural organic derivative of beta-carboline.  It is an alkaloid chemically related to tryptamines.  Derivatives of tryptoline have a variety of pharmacological properties and are known collectively as tryptolines.

Pharmacology

Many tryptolines are competitive selective inhibitors of the enzyme monoamine oxidase type A (MAO-A). 5-Hydroxytryptoline and 5-methoxytryptoline (pinoline) are the most active monoamine oxidase inhibitors (MAOIs) with IC50s of 0.5 μM and 1.5 μM respectively, using 5-hydroxytryptamine (serotonin) as substrate.

Tryptolines are also potent reuptake inhibitors of serotonin and epinephrine, with a significantly greater selectivity for serotonin. Comparison of the inhibition kinetics of tetrahydro-β-carbolines for serotonin and epinephrine reuptake to that of the platelet aggregation response to these amines has shown that 5-hydroxymethtryptoline, methtryptoline, and tryptoline are poor inhibitors of reuptake. In all respects 5-hydroxytryptoline and 5-methoxytryptoline showed greater pharmacological activity than the tryptoline and methtryptoline.

Although the in vivo formation of tryptolines has been a matter of controversy, they have profound pharmacological activity.

See also
 Norharmane
 harmane
 beta-Carboline
 Harmala alkaloid

References

 

Tryptamine alkaloids
Beta-Carbolines
Monoamine oxidase inhibitors